Xakriabá (also written Chakriaba, Chikriaba, Shacriaba) is an extinct or dormant Akuwẽ (Central Jê) language (Jê, Macro-Jê) formerly spoken in Minas Gerais, Brazil by the Xakriabá people, who today speak Portuguese. The language is known through two short wordlists collected by Augustin Saint-Hilaire and Wilhelm Ludwig von Eschwege.

The last confirmed native speaker of the language died in 1864.

Phonology

Vowels 

 /i/ can also be heard as [ɪ] in shortened positions.

Consonants 

 Sounds [j] is heard from /i/ before other vowels or within diphthongs.
 Sounds [ʃ ʒ] are heard as allophones of /s z/.
 Sounds [tʃ dʒ ɲ] are heard as allophones of /t d n/ when palatalized before /i/.
 [ɡ] can be heard as an allophone of /k/.

History
Before 1712, Xakriabá was originally spoken along the São Francisco River near São Romão, Minas Gerais (Saint-Hilaire 2000: 340-341). In 1819, Saint-Hilaire (1975: 145) noted that the Xakriabá of Triângulo Mineiro region spoke a Xerente dialect.

References

Jê languages
Extinct languages of South America
Languages of Brazil
Languages extinct in the 1860s